Haukur Heiðar Hauksson (born 1 September 1991) is an Icelandic retired football right back.

Club career
Haukur started his career with local club KA in 2008. He moved to KR in the Úrvalsdeild before the 2012 season. After the Icelandic 2014 season Haukur signed a five-year contract with AIK in Sweden. In November 2018 Haukur rejoined his local club KA to play with them in Úrvalsdeild.

International career
Haukur made his first international appearance on 19 January 2015 in a match against Canada, playing the entire match.

He was selected for EURO 2016.

Career statistics

References

External links

1991 births
Living people
Haukur Heidar Hauksson
Haukur Heidar Hauksson
Haukur Heidar Hauksson
Haukur Heidar Hauksson
Knattspyrnufélag Akureyrar players
Knattspyrnufélag Reykjavíkur players
Icelandic expatriate footballers
Úrvalsdeild karla (football) players
Allsvenskan players
Icelandic expatriate sportspeople in Sweden
Expatriate footballers in Sweden
AIK Fotboll players
Association football fullbacks
UEFA Euro 2016 players
People from Akureyri